The 1981 National Challenge Cup was the 68th edition of the USSF's annual open soccer championship. Teams from the North American Soccer League declined to participate.  Maccabee A.C. defeated Brooklyn Dodgers in the final game. The score was 5–1.

References

External links
 1981 National Challenge Cup – TheCup.us

Lamar Hunt U.S. Open Cup
U.S. Open Cup